Eugene Rousseau (born August 23, 1932 in Blue Island, Illinois) is an American classical saxophonist. He plays mainly the alto and soprano saxophones.

Career

Eugene Rousseau studied at the Paris conservatory on a Fulbright grant with Marcel Mule in 1962.  Following his studies at the Paris Conservatory, he earned a doctoral degree at the University of Iowa where his principal teacher was Himie Voxman. With Paul Brodie, another pupil of Marcel Mule, he was the co-organizer of the first World Saxophone Congress in Chicago in 1969. During 2005 Rousseau served as President of the Organizing Committee for the World Saxophone Congress XIII, held in Minneapolis, Minnesota. The North American Saxophone Alliance honored him with its highest award, an Honorary Life Membership.

He has been a consultant for saxophone research to the Yamaha Corporation since 1972. The "Eugene Rousseau saxophone mouthpiece" has been commercially available since the late 1970s.

In 1985, he recorded a video program for Yamaha Corporation called Steps to Excellence.

Rousseau has served as President of both the North American Saxophone Alliance (1979–1980) and the Comité International du Saxophone (1982–1985).

In 1993, Eugene Rousseau was designated an honorary faculty member of the Prague Conservatory.

In 2003, Rousseau hosted the 13th World Saxophone Congress at the University of Minnesota School of Music.

Teaching and performing career
Rousseau is an orchestral saxophonist and teacher. He taught at Indiana University from 1964 to 2000. He was succeeded as professor of saxophone by Otis Murphy, himself a former student of Rousseau. He holds the title of "Distinguished Professor of Music" there.

Rousseau joined the faculty of the School of Music at the University of Minnesota in the fall of 2000. He retired from teaching in 2015.

He has taught a master course at the Mozarteum in Salzburg annually since 1991.

Publications
Rousseau wrote a book which was published in France under the title Marcel Mule: sa vie et le saxophone and also in America under the title Marcel Mule: His Life and the Saxophone He also published two method books: The E. Rousseau Beginning Saxophone Method (English, German, Japanese) and Saxophone High Tones (English, French, German). In addition, he has had many transcriptions published for saxophone performance.

Discography
Rousseau has recorded with the Haydn Trio of Vienna, the Budapest Strings, and the Winds of Indiana.

Saxophone Concertos, issued 1971 by Deutsche Grammophon, was the first disc containing only saxophone concertos with orchestra. This recording was reissued on compact disc in 1998.
Saxophone Vocalise (Delos 3188) features Rousseau with the Winds of Indiana, Frederick Fennell, conductor, playing classical music of Bruch, Gershwin, Heiden, Massenet, Muczynski, Puccini et al.
Celebration (McGill) features Rousseau with the Gerald Danovitch Saxophone Quartet
Eugene Rousseau with the Haydn Trio of Vienna (RICA-1003)
The Music of Jindrich Feld ( RICA-1004) features Rousseau playing music of this Czech composer Jindrich Feld with the Janacek Philharmonic Orchestra and pianist Jaromir Klepac
The Undowithoutable Instrument (RICA-1002) features Rousseau playing soprano saxophone with the Budapest Strings
Saxophone Masterpieces (RICA-1001) features Rousseau with pianist Jaromir Klepac
Mr. Mellow (Liscio) features Rousseau with the ER Big Band
Meditation From Thais (ALCD-7021) features Rousseau playing classical works on several different sizes of saxophones

Musical works written for Rousseau
Several pieces for classical saxophone were written for Rousseau, including:
Partita by Juan Orrego-Salas
Sonata for alto saxophone and piano by Jindrich Feld
Solo by Bernhard Heiden (1969)
Fantasia Concertante for alto saxophone and winds by Bernhard Heiden
Hear Again in Memory by Frederick A. Fox
Visitations for two saxophones by Frederick A. Fox
Skyscrapings for alto saxophone and piano by Don Freund
Concerto after Gliere for alto saxophone and orchestra by David DeBoor Canfield (2007)
Quintet for Alto Saxophone and String Quartet with Chimes Ad Libitum  by David DeBoor Canfield (2016)
Song Concerto for soprano and alto saxophones and chamber orchestra by Libby Larsen
Lamentations (pour la fin du monde) for soprano and alto saxophones and chamber orchestra by Claude Baker
''"Mélodie pour Eugene Rousseau" for alto saxophone and orchestra (strings and harp) by Marco Ciccone (2014)

References

External links

1932 births
Classical saxophonists
American classical saxophonists
American male saxophonists
Distinguished Service to Music Medal recipients
Living people
People from Blue Island, Illinois
21st-century American saxophonists
21st-century American male musicians